, known by the pen name , is a Japanese manga artist. She made her manga debut in the January 1984 issue of Ciao with her story Chotto dake Biyaku. Since then, Arai has contributed many stories to Ciao, its sister magazine ChuChu, and fellow Shogakukan shojo magazine Cheese!.

Works
This list may not be comprehensive.
Alice ni Omakase! (Leave it to Alice)
Angel Lip
Natural Angel (sequel of Angel Lip)
Ask Dr. Rin! (Dr. Lin ni Kiitemite!) (feng shui-themed manga)
Beauty Pop
Curry Club ni Ai ni Kite
Genki de Fight!!
Kamisama O•Ne•Ga•I
Kokuhaku Hiyori
Magical Idol Pastel Yumi
Magical Star Magical Emi
Yomogi Mochi Yake Ta?
Runway wo Produce!!
Mito No Otsubone
Runway Wars!

Awards
In 1999, Arai won the 44th Shogakukan Manga Award for shōjo manga for her manga Angel Lip.

References

External links

 Kiyoko Arai manga  at Media Arts Database 

Women manga artists
People from Tokyo
Manga artists from Tokyo
Japanese female comics artists
Female comics writers
Living people
20th-century Japanese women writers
21st-century Japanese women writers
Year of birth missing (living people)
Pseudonymous artists
Pseudonymous women writers
20th-century pseudonymous writers
21st-century pseudonymous writers